Paradiplozoon is a genus of polyopisthocotylean monogeneans (a group of ectoparasitic flatworms), included in the family Diplozoidae.

According to the World Register of Marine Species, the genus includes the following species:
 Paradiplozoon bliccae (Reichenbach-Klinke, 1961)
 Paradiplozoon chazaricum (Mikailov, 1973)
 Paradiplozoon hemiculteri (Ling, 1973)
 Paradiplozoon homoion (Bychowsky & Nagibina, 1959)
 Paradiplozoon ichthyoxanthon Avenant-Oldewage, le Roux, Mashego & van Vuuren, 2013
 Paradiplozoon iraqense Al-Nasiri & Balbuena, 2016
 Paradiplozoon rutili (Gläser, 1967)
 Paradiplozoon skrjabini Akhmerov, 1974
 Paradiplozoon vaalense Dos Santos, Jansen van Vuuren & Avenant-Oldewage, 2015

References

Polyopisthocotylea
Monogenea genera